Bitch of the Year may refer to:

Bitch of the Year, Irish Greyhound of the Year Awards
"Bitch of the Year", song by Krewella